Katunino is a rural locality (a settlement) and the administrative center of Katuninskoye Rural Settlement of Primorsky District, Arkhangelsk Oblast, Russia. The population was 3,443 as of 2010. There are 9 streets.

Geography 
Katunino is located on the Lakhtinskoye Lake, 22 km south of Arkhangelsk (the district's administrative centre) by road. Lakhta is the nearest rural locality.

References 

Rural localities in Primorsky District, Arkhangelsk Oblast